Dülmen is a town in the district of Coesfeld, North Rhine-Westphalia, Germany.

Geography
Dülmen is situated in the south part of the Münsterland area, between the Lippe river to the south, the Baumberge hills to the north and the Ems river to the east. South of Dülmen the Ruhr area is located.

Neighbouring municipalities
 Haltern
 Reken
 Coesfeld
 Billerbeck
 Nottuln
 Senden
 Lüdinghausen

Divisions

After the local government reforms of 1975 Dülmen consists of the 7 subdivisions Dülmen, Kirchspiel, Buldern, Hausdülmen, Hiddingsel,  Merfeld and Rorup.

Merfeld was first mentioned in 890.  It became a part of Dülmen in 1975. It is known for its herd of Dülmen Ponies.
Rorup was first mentioned in 1050 and became a district of Dülmen in 1975.

History

The place was first mentioned as Dulmenni in 889, as a property of Werden Abbey. Dülmen received town privileges in 1311. It joined the Hanseatic League in 1470. It was part of the Prince-Bishopric of Münster until it was mediatised in 1803. After a short period in the hands of the House of Croÿ, it was taken by the French in 1811. After the defeat of Napoleon, it became part of the Prussian Province of Westphalia. The Dülmen oil plant was a target of the Oil Campaign of World War II: 90% of the city was destroyed and the city was rebuilt after the war.  In 1973, the population reached 20,000.  In 1975, Rorup, Merfeld, Hiddingsel, Buldern, Hausdülmen and Kirchspiel Dülmen became part of Dülmen.

Twin towns – sister cities

Dülmen is twinned with:
 Charleville-Mézières, France

Transportation
Dülmen can accessed by the A43. Dülmen station is on the Essen–Wanne Eickel–Münster line, which was built by the Cologne-Minden Railway Company, and the Dortmund–Enschede railway, which was built by the Dortmund-Gronau-Enschede Railway Company  and links Dortmund and Gronau. The nearest airports are the Münster-Osnabrück Airport in Greven and the Düsseldorf Airport.

Notable people
Anne Catherine Emmerich (1774–1824), canoness and mystic, lived and died here
Clemens Brentano (1778–1842), writer, lived here from 1819 to 1824
Franz von Papen (1879–1969), politician, lived in Dülmen from 1918 to 1930
Fritz Pütter (1895–1918), fighter pilot
Marianne Werner (born 1924), athlete
Jürgen Drews (born 1945), entertainer, lives here
Hartmut Surmann (born 1963), robotics researcher
Franka Potente (born 1974), actress, lived here in childhood

References

External links
  
 Sommer in Dülmen 
 Winter in Dülmen 
 Heimatverein Dülmen e.V. 
 Local radiostation 
 Local merchant community 

Towns in North Rhine-Westphalia
Coesfeld (district)
Members of the Hanseatic League